In League With Dragons is the seventeenth studio album by the Mountain Goats, released on April 26, 2019, on Merge Records. Inspired by tabletop role-playing games such as Dungeons & Dragons, the album has been described as a "partial rock opera" with influences from noir literature.

Background 
Indie rock band the Mountain Goats released their 16th full-length studio album, Goths, on May 19, 2017, via Merge Records. The album was inspired by John Darnielle's childhood enjoyment of gothic rock. After supporting Jason Isbell on tour in June and July 2017, the Mountain Goats went on a North American headlining tour from September through December 2017 in support of Goths.

Release 
The album was announced on January 28, 2019. The announcement was accompanied by a live streaming event on Facebook and Twitch, hosted by Wizards of the Coast. The band also released three singles from the album: "Younger", "Cadaver Sniffing Dog", and "Sicilian Crest". The release of "Sicilian Crest" was accompanied by an hour-long discussion about the making of the song by frontman John Darnielle and podcaster Joseph Fink, on the podcast I Only Listen to the Mountain Goats; season two of the podcast will ultimately consist of a track-by-track discussion of each song on the album.

The album was released on April 26, 2019, on Merge Records. Special editions of the album come with an additional 7-inch record, Sentries in the Ambush EP, featuring two non-album tracks.

Track listing

Reception 

At Metacritic, which assigns a normalised rating out of 100 to reviews from mainstream critics, the album received an average score of 77 (based on 14 reviews) indicating "generally favorable reviews."

Personnel 

John Darnielle – vocals, piano, lyrics, composition
Peter Hughes – bass
Jon Wurster – drums, percussion
Matt Douglas – woodwinds, guitars, vocals
Thom Gill – guitars 
Johnny Spence – organ, Memorymoog, piano, Wurlitzer, synth 
Bram Gielen – guitars, piano, synth 
Owen Pallett – piano, organ, guitar, production
Dan Dugmore – pedal steel
Robert Bailey – vocal arrangements, vocals
Everett Drake – vocals
Jason Eskridge – vocals
Michael Mishaw – vocals
The Macedonian Radio Symphonic Orchestra – strings
strings arranged by Owen Pallett, conducted by Oleg Kondratenko, engineered by Giorgi Hristovski with Atanas Babaleski
Matt Ross-Spang – engineering 
Shani Gandhi – mixing 
Brent Lambert – mastering 
Elton D'Souza – artwork 
Daniel Murphy – design

Charts

References

External links 
Merge Records In League with Dragons store page

The Mountain Goats albums
2019 albums
Rock operas
Dungeons & Dragons
Merge Records albums